The Cicak Man is a Malaysian film series consisting of three superhero films based on the fictional KRU Studios's Cicak Man comic book, portrayed by Hairi Yatim.

KRU hired his trusted crew, Yusry Abdul Halim to direct all the films, and the series began with Cicak Man (2006) and  Cicak Man 2: Planet Hitam (2008). For the third film, Cicak Man 3 (2015), the film were co-directed by Yusry and Ghaz Abu Bakar .

For the first two films, Hairi (Saiful Apek) developed a relationship with his lab partner crush, Tania Ashraf (Fasha Sandha). He battled the villains Professor Klon (Aznil Nawawi), Ginger 1/Ginger Ghost 1 (Adlin Aman Ramlie), Ginger 2/Ginger Ghost 2 (AC Mizal), and Rrama (Tamara Bleszynski). For the third film, Hairi have abandoned his responsibility as Cicak Man and leave Metrofulus. A new superhero emerged during his absence, known as SuperBro (Yus Jambu). He left a box containing all the requirements to become a Cicak Man inside Cicak Man statue in Metrofulus which later being discovered by his successor, Man (Zizan Razak).

Development

Cicak Mans CGI development
The film was shot using Dolby TrueHD, and about 40% of the film was shot in Green Screen. The visual effects team led by the director, Yusry, used CGI technology to fully realise the fictional city of Bandar Metrofulus (which was based on Kuala Lumpur), the protagonist's super-hero movements and various digital sets. Over 90% of the rotoscoping and compositing work were carried out by KRU Films (now known as KRU Studios), who were also behind the musical scores and audio effects.

Cicak Man 2: Planet Hitam production
The shooting that took place in Penang, Gua Tempurung, Kampar, Universiti Teknologi Petronas, and Kuala Lumpur costs 2.5 million Ringgit. The costume used in the sequel is higher in quality than the prequel as well as the price cost RM 50 thousand per set while in the prequel the costume used costs only RM 20 thousand per set.

Cicak Man 3 production
The shooting took place in Kuala Lumpur and Johor. The production cost were 4 million Ringgit. The rise in cost is mostly due to the cost of the costume for Cicak Man and SuperBro, each amounted 100 thousand Ringgit each.

Film series

After this long development history, the Cicak Man films were produced by Norman Abdul Halim, Yusry Abdul Halim, Edry Abdul HalimJohn Lucas and distributed by KRU, Grand Brilliance Sdn Bhd, PT Tripar Multi Vision Plus, Cathay-Keris Films Pte Ltd, the primary film production holding of KRU.  They both directed by director Yusry Abdul Halim.

Cicak Man (2006)

Hairi (Saiful Apek), is a loser who lives in Metrofulus. While working in the lab, he accidentally drinks coffee that has been contaminated by a virus-infected gecko. He soon finds himself doing the most insane things, such as sticking to walls, making chirping cicak noises and adding bugs to his menu. He turns to his best friend and apartment mate, Danny (Yusry Abdul Halim), and begs him to find the reason behind his strange antics.

Meanwhile, the people of Metrofulus are constantly being infected by new strains of viruses, and the only cure seems to come only from Professor Klon's (Aznil Nawawi) lab. Suspecting something amiss, Hairi and Danny launch their own investigation and discover that Professor Klon is not only the creator of such viruses, but also has a more sinister plan up his sleeve, backed by his business partners, the Ginger Boys (played by Adlin Aman Ramlie and AC Mizal), who first tend to take revenge on Professor Klon's failed experiment on them; making their senses turn abnormal. Hairi soon makes use his new power as "Cicakman" and makes a fullstop to Professor Klon and Ginger Boys, while same time leading his love towards his lab partner, Tania (Fasha Sandha).

Cicak Man 2: Planet Hitam (2008)

The evil Professor Klon (Aznil Nawawi) is back. This time, not only to overthrow the government and become the President of Metrofulus, but also to control the world's supply of fresh water through his ingenious plan; "Black Planet". When our blue planet has only 72 hours before turning black, Cicakman (Saiful Apek) comes to rescue.

But much to his surprise he face his old enemies; Ginger Boys, who return even more powerful as spiritual form as Ginger Ghosts (Adlin Aman Ramlie & AC Mizal). In addition, he is now faced with Professor Klon's hired assassin; Rrama (Tamara Bleszynski), an assassin who derives pleasure in killing as if it were a pure art form. As the situation starts taking a downward spiral, even a super hero needs help. But help appears in the most unexpected forms, including Danny (Yusry Abd Halim) his demised best friend, a powerful feng shui master, Miss Chee (Louisa Chong) and an unlikely party.

Apart from his heavy responsibilities to save the world, he also has his own personal dilemmas to address; that is Hairi vs Cicakman. He has to resolve his personal feelings towards Tania (Fasha Sandha), who is seeking the true identity of Cicakman and he also has to choose whether to sacrifice his own life or save Iman (Sharifah Amani), Danny's blind sister.

Cicak Man 3 (2015)

Set after 7 years of the event of Cicak Man 2: Planet Hitam. Metrofulus superhero, Cicakman had disappeared, many people say Cicakman is dead or retired. So, The new superhero has emerged known as Superbro has become a major superhero in Metrofulus and he is venerated by many people. The man named Man (Zizan Razak) has found a box left by former Cicakman (Saiful Apek) at the Cicakman monument.

Cast and characters
Italics indicate a transition to a minor role, such as an extended flashback, after the initial appearance.
A dark grey cell indicates the character was not in the film.

Reception
Cicak-Man created Malaysian movie history by grossing RM350,000 with an audience attendance number of 47,116 in its first day. The film eventually gave its production company, KRU Group of Companies, a RM6.7 million boost due to sales. Cicak-Man received many appreciation from various persons for the director's efforts even before it is released. One of them is Yusof Haslam alias "Six Million Dollar Man". David Teo as a film producer and CEO of Metrowealth International Group referred Cicak Man as a miracle with the response and difference shown in Malaysian filming industry. Besides film maker, ex-president of Persatuan Sutradara Malaysia (FDAM), Ahmad Ibrahim, praised this masterpiece created by Yusry and KRU. While there were people who praised Cicak Man, there were many others who criticised this film greatly. Mansor Putih in an interview by Harian Metro said that the film has no 'soul', aesthetic values and culture. There were individuals who compared between Cicak Man and Spider-Man, Batman, Superman, and other superhero films from Hollywood, but before it was released to public, the director, Yusry had advised people to not compare Cicak Man with other superhero characters because the budget is obviously lower compared to Hollywood productions.. Cicak Man 2: Planet Hitam was first released at the 13th Pusan International Film Festival on 5 October 2008 as world premiere for superheroes in Asia segment. Other two sessions was held on 7 October at the festival. In Malaysia, Singapore and Brunei, the film had been released on 11 December 2008 with the goal by the producer of a million tickets sold compared to 670 thousand tickets sold for Cicak Man. The film is expected to be released in Indonesia in January 2009.

References

Film series introduced in 2006
Action film series
Malaysian film series
Malaysian superhero films